Whitehead-Fogleman Farm is a historic home and farm located near Crutchfield Crossroads, Chatham County, North Carolina. The main house was built about 1838, and is a two-story, Federal style frame dwelling.  Also on the property are the contributing saddle-notch log corn crib, a square-notch log and board-and-batten well house, a large V-notch log barn, and a one-room board-and-batten kitchen.

It was listed on the National Register of Historic Places in 1985.

References

Houses on the National Register of Historic Places in North Carolina
Federal architecture in North Carolina
Houses completed in 1838
Houses in Chatham County, North Carolina
National Register of Historic Places in Chatham County, North Carolina